Jodie Ann Swallow (born 23 June 1981) is a British triathlete and former swimmer from Brentwood, Essex.

Triathon career
Swallow is the 2010 Ironman 70.3 champion as well as the winner of the 2009 and 2016 ITU Long Distance Triathlon World Championships.

In 2004, Swallow represented Great Britain at the Summer Olympics competing in triathlon, placing 34th. At the 2014 Ironman World Championship she placed 4th, less than 10 minutes behind champion Mirinda Carfrae.

Swimming career
At the ASA National British Championships she won the 400 metres medley title in 1996.

References

External links

Profiles: Jodie Swallow (GBR) Triathlon.org

1981 births
Living people
English female triathletes
Triathletes at the 2004 Summer Olympics
Olympic triathletes of Great Britain
Alumni of Loughborough University
Sportspeople from Loughborough
Triathletes at the 2002 Commonwealth Games
Commonwealth Games competitors for England